For the plant genus, see Chaetopappa.

Bourdonia is a genus of isopod crustaceans in the family Cabiropidae.

Bourdonia tridentata is a hyperparasite of Bopyroides hippolytes from the shrimp Pandalus borealis.

References

Cymothoida
Isopod genera
Hyperparasites